Galyan may refer to:

 A type of hookah or pipe
 Galyan's, an American sporting goods chain

See also
 Galin, Iran (disambiguation)